The Museum at Warm Springs is a museum in Warm Springs, Oregon, United States, on the Warm Springs Indian Reservation. The museum houses a large collection of North American Indian artifacts. The museum was constructed at a cost of $7.6 million.

Facilities
The museum has a vast collection of artifacts, historic photographs, murals, graphics, and rare documents. Other resources include interactive multimedia exhibits that include a Wasco wedding, song chamber, and traditional Hoop dance.

The museum offers walking trails along Shitike Creek. There is a picnic area and an outdoor amphitheater for performances and demonstrations.

External links
 The Museum at Warm Springs

Native American museums in Oregon
Museums in Jefferson County, Oregon
Museums established in 1993
1993 establishments in Oregon